The Mirovo mine is a large salt mine located in eastern Bulgaria in Veliko Tarnovo Province. Mirovo represents one of the largest salt reserves in Bulgaria having estimated reserves of 4,357 million tonnes of NaCl.

References 

Salt mines in Bulgaria